Ryenchinii Choinom (10 Feb 1936 - 24 Apr 1978) was a Mongolian poet. He was born on 10 February 1936 in the Darkhan Sum of the Khentii Province and died in 1978. Choinom's poems are famous for their fearlessness and realism. Throughout his life, his poems were widely popular but never received any official recognition under communist Mongolia. Many of his love lyrics became popular songs. He was jailed under pretext of writing poems that neglect the "Socialist achievements" and his works were prohibited.

Choinom graduated from the literature department of the National University of Mongolia, and pursued a productive literary career that gave birth to several novels and to collections of poems such as "Sumtei Budaryn Chuluu". Beside Mongolian, he also wrote in Kazakh.

In 1991 Choinom was posthumously issued the Mongolian National Honor.

Exemplary works 
 Hour of the fire horse (in Mongolian language, Gal morin tsag)
 Young age (Zaluu nas)
 With a Temple Stone (Sümtei Budaryn Chuluu)
 Steppe (Tal)
 Red Notebook (Ulaan Devter)
 Human (Khün)
 A Letter to the Daughter (Ohindoo Bichsen Zahidal)
 Puppy  (golog)

External links
About R. Choinom on www.ELibrary.mn

Mongolian poets
1936 births
1978 deaths
20th-century poets
National University of Mongolia alumni
20th-century Mongolian poets